is a railway station is a passenger railway station in located in the town of Taiki, Watarai District, Mie Prefecture, Japan, operated by Central Japan Railway Company (JR Tōkai).

Lines

Station layout
The station consists of a single side platform and a single island platform serving three tracks, connected by a footbridge. The station is unattended.

Platforms

History
Ōuchiyama Station opened on 13 November 1927 as a station on the Japanese Government Railways (JGR) Kisei-East Line. The line was extended on to Kii-Nagashima Station on 26 April 1929. The JGR became the Japan National Railways (JNR) after World War 2, and the line was renamed the Kisei Main Line on 15 July 1959. The station has been unattended since 21 December 1983. The station was absorbed into the JR Central network upon the privatization of the JNR on 1 April 1987. A new station building was completed in 2002.

Passenger statistics
In fiscal 2019, the station was used by an average of 35 passengers daily (boarding passengers only).

Surrounding area
Ouchiyama Wild Bird Observatory
Ouchiyama Elementary School 
Kobenomiyayomo Shrine
Ouchiyama Zoo

See also
List of railway stations in Japan

References

External links

 JR Central timetable 

Railway stations in Japan opened in 1927
Railway stations in Mie Prefecture
Taiki, Mie